Andrewhinney Hill is a hill in the Ettrick Hills range, part of the Southern Uplands of Scotland. It is the highest summit of a ridge that runs parallel to the A708 road on its southern side, with the Grey Mare's Tail in the Moffat Hills directly opposite. The northwestern slopes are designated as part of the 'Moffat Hills' SSSI and SAC.

Subsidiary SMC Summits

References

Mountains and hills of the Southern Uplands
Mountains and hills of the Scottish Borders
Mountains and hills of Dumfries and Galloway
Marilyns of Scotland
Donald mountains
Grahams